Carlos A. Carrillo is a municipality in Veracruz, Mexico.

Geography
It is located about 245 km from state capital Xalapa. It has a surface of 239.59 km2.

Carlos A. Carrillo Municipality is delimited to the north by Amatitlán Municipality, to the east by José Azueta Municipality, to the south by Chacaltianguis Municipality, to the west by Cosamaloapan Municipality and to the north-west by Ixmatlahuacan Municipality.

Products
It produces principally maize, beans, chili pepper, sugarcane and Sweet potato.

Events
In July, the town celebrates San Cristobal patron saint of the town.

Weather
The weather in Carlos A. Carrillo is warm in all the year and has rains in summer and autumn.

References

External links 

  Municipal Official Site
  Municipal Official Information

Municipalities of Veracruz